The 2016–17 season was Mumbai F.C.'s eighth season in the I-League since its establishment in 2007. Mumbai were relegated to I-League 2nd division at the end of the season.

Background

The club narrowly avoided relegation last season finishing with 19 from their 16 outings with four wins, seven draws and five losses. Following the disappointing campaign the club also parted company with former player and long-time head coach Khalid Jamil.

Transfers
Keepers Sanjiban Ghosh and Pawan Kumar(Mohun Bagan)  headed for the exit. They are joined by defenders Srikanth Ramu, Thiyam Chingkheinganba and Ashutosh Mehta who has joined Aizawl FC. Midfielders Malemngamba Meetei (to  NEROCA FC), Taisuke Matsugae, Eric Brown, Asif Kottayil, Darren Caldeira(to Bengaluru FC and later Chennai City FC and Arata Izumi ( NEROCA FC) have moved on. The frontline will also have a new look to it with the departures of Rohit Mirza, Ryuki Kozawa, Jayesh Rane and Cletus Paul.

In

Competitions

Overall

I-League

Matches

Table

Results summary

See also
 2016–17 in Indian football

Mumbai
Mumbai FC seasons